The 1928 United States Senate election in Vermont took place on November 6, 1928. Incumbent Republican Frank L. Greene successfully ran for re-election to another term in the United States Senate, defeating Democratic candidate Fred C. Martin. Greene died in December 1930 and Frank C. Partridge was appointed to fill the seat until a special election could be held in March 1931.

Republican primary

Results

Democratic primary

Results

General election

Results

See also 
 United States Senate elections, 1928

References

Vermont
1928
1928 Vermont elections